The Desmond Elliott Prize is an annual award for the best debut novel written in English and published in the UK. The winning novel can be from any genre of fiction and must exhibit depth and breadth with a compelling narrative. The winner receives . The prize is named in honour of the distinguished late publisher and literary agent, Desmond Elliott.

History and administration 

The Desmond Elliott Prize was inaugurated at the bequest of Desmond Elliott, who died in August 2003. He stipulated that his literary estate should be invested in a charitable trust that would fund a literary award "to enrich the careers of new writers". The prize is therefore dedicated to supporting and celebrating aspiring authors and their fiction.

The Desmond Elliott Prize was launched in 2007 as a biennial award for a first novel published in the UK. The inaugural prize was won by Nikita Lalwani for her novel, Gifted, in June 2008. After the successful launch of the prize, the trustees decided to make it an annual award. Edward Hogan won the prize in 2009 for his novel Blackmoor, Ali Shaw the 2010 prize for his novel The Girl with Glass Feet and Anjali Joseph in 2011 for her novel Saraswati Park.

The prize is administered by Emma Manderson and the trustees of The Desmond Elliott Charitable Trust, a UK charitable foundation. The Trust is chaired by Dallas Manderson, former Group Sales Director of the Orion Publishing Group. He is joined by Christine Berry, a partner in the charities group at Taylor Vinters, a Cambridge-based law firm, and Liz Thomson, an arts journalist and author. Both Dallas and Christine worked with Desmond Elliott at Arlington Books.

Judging 

The panel of three judges, which changes each year, is selected by the trustees of the prize.

When selecting a winner, the judges look for a novel with a compelling narrative, arresting character, and which is both vividly written and confidently realised.

Previous chairs of the prize include author Sam Llewellyn (2012), BBC broadcaster and presenter Edward Stourton (2011), and authors Elizabeth Buchan (2010), Candida Lycett Green (2009) and Penny Vincenzi (2008).

Rules and entry 

The prize is awarded annually for the best first full-length work of fiction written in English published in book form in the UK, written by an author whose permanent place of residence is in the UK or Ireland. Entries are considered from all fiction genres.

The prize is selected from a longlist of 10 titles, followed by a shortlist of three outstanding books. For inclusion in this shortlist, a novel must have the full support of at least one judge in whose opinion it is a valid contender for the Prize.  Each shortlisted author receives a hamper from Fortnum & Mason.

The winner of the Desmond Elliott Prize is announced at an awards ceremony held at Fortnum & Mason, Desmond Elliott's local grocer.

Winners and shortlists

References

Awards established in 2008
2008 establishments in England
British literary awards
First book awards